Norm Eash (born c. 1953) is an American football coach. He is the head football coach at Illinois Wesleyan University in Bloomington, Illinois, a position he has held since 1987. Eash attended Illinois Wesleyan, where he lettered in football from 1971 to 1974.  He began his coaching career at Streator Township High School in Streator, Illinois, served as offensive coordinator from 1975 to 1981. Eash then moved to Dwight High School in Dwight, Illinois, where he compiled a record of 34–15 in five seasons as head coach, from  1982 to 1986.

Eash won his 200th game as head coach at Illinois Wesleyan on November 11, 2017.

Head coaching record

College

See also
 List of college football coaches with 200 wins

References

External links
 Illinois Wesleyan profile

Year of birth missing (living people)
1950s births
Living people
American football defensive linemen
American football offensive tackles
Illinois Wesleyan Titans football coaches
Illinois Wesleyan Titans football players
High school basketball coaches in Illinois
High school football coaches in Illinois
People from Chenoa, Illinois
Coaches of American football from Illinois
Players of American football from Illinois